USA-1 may refer to:
USA-1 (satellite), an early GPS navigation satellite
USA-1 (monster truck), a monster truck built in the 1970s